The 2013–14 San Diego Sockers season was the fifth season of the San Diego Sockers professional indoor soccer club. The San Diego Sockers, a Pacific Division team in the Professional Arena Soccer League and the 2012–13 league champion, played their home games in the Valley View Casino Center in San Diego, California. The team was led by general manager John Kentera and head coach Phil Salvagio with assistant coach Ray Taila. The Sockers finished the regular season 2nd in the Pacific Division with a 13–3 record, qualifying for the post-season but lost to the Las Vegas Legends in the Division Final.

Season summary
The team struggled from the start of the season, dropping home games to the Dallas Sidekicks and the Monterrey Flash, snapping the San Diego franchise's long-running home winning streak. The Sockers then won 7 consecutive games, including 5 on the road, before surrendering an unprecedented 12 goals and falling to the Las Vegas Legends at home on January 11. The team won their last 6 regular season games to finish with a 13–3 record and qualified for postseason play. They defeated Tijuana-based Toros Mexico in the Pacific Division Semifinal but fell 7–11 to the Las Vegas Legends in the Division Final.

The San Diego Sockers participated in the 2013–14 United States Open Cup for Arena Soccer starting with a Round of 32 victory over the Ontario Fury on December 28, 2013, to advance to the Round of 16 where they lost to the Las Vegas Legends 9–12 on January 11.

History
This is the third professional soccer franchise to use the "San Diego Sockers" name. The original Sockers were founded in 1978 and played in the North American Soccer League, original Major Indoor Soccer League, and the Continental Indoor Soccer League before ceasing operations in 1996. The second Sockers were briefly revived for the World Indoor Soccer League in 2001 and transitioned to the Major Indoor Soccer League II in 2002 before folding in 2004.

The current Sockers were founded in 2009 and played their first three seasons at the Chevrolet Del Mar Arena in Del Mar, California, before moving to Valley View Casino Center before the 2012–13 season. The VVCC, then known as the San Diego Sports Arena, hosted the indoor games of both of the previous Sockers franchises.

Roster moves
Veteran player Aaron Susi announced in late February 2014 that he would retire from arena soccer after the end of the Sockers' season.

Awards and honors
On December 17, 2013, the Professional Arena Soccer League named forward Kraig Chiles as the PASL Player of the Week. The league cited his resurgent scoring efforts, including five goals and two assists in the previous weekend's road games.

On January 7, 2014, the PASL named midfielder Brian Farber as the league's Player of the Week. The league cited his leadership and scoring efforts, including five goals and one assist, in his team's road win over Toros Mexico.

On January 28, 2014, the PASL named Kraig Chiles as its Player of the Week for the second time this season. The league cited his league-leading scoring efforts and four game-winning goals in bestowing the repeat honors.

On February 26, 2014, the PASL announced its "All-League" honors. Forward Kraig Chiles was named to the All-League First Team while defender Evan McNeley and goalkeeper Chris Toth were named to the All-League Honorable Mention list.

Schedule

Regular season

† Game also counts for US Open Cup, as listed in chart below.

Post-season

U.S. Open Cup for Arena Soccer

References

External links
San Diego Sockers official website
ESPN Radio 1700 official website
San Diego Sockers at U-T San Diego

San Diego Sockers seasons
San Diego Sockers
San Diego Sockers 2013
San Diego Sockers 2013